The  (lit. "Charles the Great and Pope Leo"), sometimes called the Paderborn Epic or the Aachen Epic, is a Carolingian Latin epic poem of which only the third of four books is extant. It recounts the meeting of Charlemagne, king of the Franks, with Pope Leo III, in AD 799.

Date, authorship, and title

Carl Erdmann first brought historians' attention to the Paderborn Epic in 1951, when he argued that it was written before June 800. The epic may have been written in 799, but probably in the decade after, certainly before Charlemagne's death in 814. Henry Mayr-Harting suggests that the court held at Aachen in 802 is the most plausible context of composition.

Janet Nelson says that "one of [Charlemagne's counsellors] surely wrote this poem," and it may have been written by his own biographer, Einhard. Francesco Stella has argued for the authorship of Modoin, whose debt to Virgil in his description of Aachen elsewhere equals that of the Paderborn poet. It was familiar to Ermold the Black, who may have used it for the hunt scene in the fourth book of his Carmina in honorem Hludovici, an epic poem in honour of Charlemagne's son Louis the Pious.

The first two as well as the final books do not survive. Helene Scheck argues that the original, complete poem "recounted Charlemagne's ascendancy" and that consequently "it would seem that the first two sections offer background on Charlemagne's rise and the poem would reach its culmination in the coronation of Charlemagne." Although it must have been more widely disseminated in Ermold's time, the only surviving copy is the single-book fragment preserved in a late ninth-century manuscript.

The conventional title, Karolus Magnus et Leo Papa, derives from the first modern edition by Ernst Dümmler in 1881. A more recent edition by F. Brunhölzl was published under the title De Karolo rege et Leone papa in 1966 and re-published in 1999. Given that the poem as it now exists is not a complete work, Dieter Schaller points out that giving the work any title that translate to "Charlemagne and Pope Leo" is rather inaccurate, as such a move over-emphasizes the importance of merely one of the many events in the larger work.

Contents

The Paderborn Epic's hunt scene probably describes an actual hunt in the spring of 799, although it is "highly stylized". The importance of women in Charlemagne's court is highlighted by the order of his retinue: Queen Luitgard, followed by sons Charles and Pippin, and then the "brilliant order of girls" (puellarum… ordo coruscus) Rotrude, Bertha, Gisela, Ruodhaid, Theodrada, and Hiltrud. During the hunt, Charlemagne stops to take a nap and dreams that Leo has been attacked and his eyes and tongue cut out.

Historically, Leo was wounded severely during an attack on 25 April 799, but his eyes and tongue were saved by Charlemagne's missi dominici. The poet nevertheless mentions the mutilation five times and seven times describes a miraculous healing. The miracle was used to attest Leo's saintliness amidst accusations of adultery by his enemies. By August 799, Charlemagne's adviser Alcuin of York had burned a letter about Leo's adulteries, perhaps convinced of his innocence by the miraculous healing.

The meeting at Paderborn was probably the first time that an imperial coronation was discussed for Charlemagne, and it is no coincidence that its verse epic is "replete with imperial phraseology". The poet compares Charlemagne to Aeneas, forefather of the Romans, and calls him augustus and Europae venerandus apex, pater optimus ("revered pinnacle of Europe; best father"). The poet also likens Charlemagne's capital of Aachen to a "second Rome" and a "Rome-to-be".

The city of the poem is generally identified with Charlemagne's capital, although it is not explicit in the poem and the city might in fact be Paderborn itself, whose church was consecrated in 799. The poet alludes to the conversion of the Saxons and praises terror as a means to an end: "What the contrary mind and perverse soul refuse to do with persuasion / Let them leap to accomplish when compelled by fear" (Quod mens laeva vetat suadendo animusque sinister / Hoc saltim cupiant implere timore coacti).

Notes

Bibliography

 
 
 
 
 
 
 
 
 
 
 
 
 
 
 
 
 
 
 

9th-century Latin books
Epic poems in Latin
Carolingian Latin historical texts
Cultural depictions of Charlemagne